Hotan railway station is a passenger railway station in Hotan, and is the main railway station of Hotan. It opened in 2011.

History
The station was completed on 28 June 2011. The station temporarily closed on 12 February 2014 due to the 2014 Yutian earthquake.

Architecture

The station building of Hotan Station has a modern and elegant shape. The outer wall is made of white granite. The front facade has white granite reliefs. The overall design fully reflects Hotan jade culture. The facade of the station building has a convex design. The main building has 3 floors. From bottom to top, there is the plaza floor, the platform floor, and the elevated floor. There are ticket halls and VIP halls on both sides, and there is a bridge in front of the station building for easy entry into the station the waiting hall.

Services

China Railway

References 

Railway stations in Xinjiang
Hotan Prefecture
Railway stations in China opened in 2011